Lloyd Ultan may refer to:

 Lloyd Ultan (composer) (1929–1998), American composer of contemporary classical music
 Lloyd Ultan (historian) (born 1938), American historian, author and professor